The Antwerp Open  is a darts tournament that has been held annually since 1988.

List of winners

Men's

Women's

Tournament records
 Most wins 3:  Colin Lloyd,  Terry Jenkins. 
 Most Finals 4:  Colin Lloyd.
 Most Semi Finals 4:  Colin Lloyd.
 Most Quarter Finals 4:  Scott Mitchell.
 Most Appearances 6:  Alan Warriner-Little,  Dennis Smith.
 Most Prize Money won €4894:  Terry Jenkins.
 Best winning average : v.
 Youngest Winner age 22:   Steve Brown. 
 Oldest Winner age 57:  Martin Adams.

References

External links

National and Brussels Darts Federation

Darts tournaments
International sports competitions hosted by Belgium
1988 establishments in Belgium
Recurring sporting events established in 1988